Morges is an unincorporated community in Rose Township, Carroll County, Ohio, United States. The community is part of the Canton–Massillon Metropolitan Statistical Area. Part of the community is served by Waynesburg, post office 44688, and part by Magnolia, post office 44643.

History

The community was platted in 1831 by Samuel Oswalt and John Waggoner along the road established by Bezaleel Wells between Canton and Steubenville, Ohio.

St. Mary's of Morges is listed in the National Register of Historic Places.

Education
Students attend the Sandy Valley Local School District.

References

Unincorporated communities in Carroll County, Ohio
Unincorporated communities in Ohio